Yllka Berisha (born January 18, 1988) is a Kosovar–Swedish model and singer.

Modelling and pageants
Berisha was born January 18, 1988, in Pristina. She won the title of Miss Kosovo on December 12, 2007. Berisha represented Kosovo at the Top Model of the World 2008 pageant in Egypt on January 18, 2008. She expressed hope of Kosovo becoming independent, so she could be the first woman to represent her country at the Miss Earth. Kosovo has since become an independent state. Before winning the Miss Kosovo title, Berisha was second runner up at the Miss Albania pageant and first runner up at the Miss Scandinavia pageant. At Miss Earth 2008 Berisha was unplaced on November 9, 2008.

Personal life
Berisha moved permanently to Laholm in Sweden with her parents in 1992 and speaks fluent Swedish, English and Albanian. She completed Swedish high-school on a science programme. She sees modelling as a hobby and aspires to become a medical doctor or an engineer. Berisha lives in Gothenburg, Sweden with her boyfriend.

Music career
Berisha is also a singer and has recorded two songs and one music video in Sweden. Her music producer is Genc Vela from 8-blockz. They wrote the lyrics for the first song together.

Notes

References

External links

celebritete.com Yllka Berisha Miss Kosova 2007.
KVP.se 17 åring från Laholm årets Miss Kosovo.
 http://www.dailymotion.com/video/xjbu8u_yllka-berisha-i-maj-ne-mend-www-besfort-de_music#.UYd5XbWTjSg  Updated music video. 

1988 births
Living people
Kosovan female models
Swedish female models
Kosovan beauty pageant winners
Miss Earth 2008 contestants
Kosovan emigrants to Sweden